David Kelly (born 4 November 1969 in Kingston, Jamaica) is a Jamaican record producer and the brother of another record producer Tony "CD" Kelly. He began his career as an engineer in the late eighties. After getting into producing at the "Penthouse" label of Donovan Germain, he started his own label "Madhouse" together with business partner Janet Davidson in 1991. He went on to become one of the most successful dancehall-producers in Jamaica, recording numerous songs that topped the local and international reggae-charts, such as "Action" by Nadine Sutherland & Terror Fabulous in 1994 or  "Look" by Bounty Killer in 1999.

Dave Kelly has released some of the most popular and influential dancehall riddims such as "Joyride," "Showtime," "Fiesta", and "85". He produced Beenie Man's international hit "Dude" featuring Ms. Thing in 2003 on the "Fiesta" riddim, which was featured on Beenie Man's album Back to Basics and Baby Cham's major hit "Ghetto Story," on the "85" riddim, which was the title track of Baby Cham's 2006 album that he also produced.
He is the producer for Buju Banton's 2020 Track "Blessed".

See also 

 Madhouse Records

External links 
 The Heat in Jamdown
 Hardwax

Jamaican record producers
Living people
1969 births
Musicians from Kingston, Jamaica